Óscar Heraldo Correa Álvarez (born 9 April 1972) is a Chilean football manager, currently in charge of Deportes La Serena.

Career
Born in Galvarino, Correa was a youth manager at Huachipato for five years before working as Jorge Pellicer's assistant.

Correa left Naval on 24 January 2017, and took over Deportes Puerto Montt on 12 June. Sacked by the latter on 15 December, he was named in charge of Deportes Magallanes on 26 May 2018.

Dismissed by Magallanes on 15 April 2019, he moved to Deportes La Serena on 30 May, after being named in charge of the youth sides. He was an interim manager of the first team on three occasions, before being named permanently in charge on 24 October 2022, after Pablo Marini left.

References

External links

1972 births
Living people
People from Cautín Province
Chilean football managers
Chilean Primera División managers
Magallanes managers
Deportes Puerto Montt managers
Deportes La Serena managers